The Idiot Maiden is a 2006 Spanish romantic comedy film directed and written by , consisting of an adaptation of the 1613 play A Lady of Little Sense by Félix Lope de Vega. It stars Silvia Abascal, Jose Coronado, Macarena Gómez, Roberto San Martín, and Verónica Forqué.

Plot 
Set in the 16th century, the plot follows the romantic entanglement of two sisters (Finea and Nise) with Laurencio and Liseo.

Cast

Production 
The film is a DeAPlaneta PC, Flamenco Films and Belén Gómez production. It was shot in 2005 at Ciudad de la Luz in Alicante, being the first film to be shot in the film studio.

Release 
The film was presented at the 9th Málaga Film Festival in March 2006. It was theatrically released in Spain on 24 March 2006.

Accolades 

|-
| align = "center" rowspan = "4" | 2006 || rowspan = "4" | 9th Málaga Film Festival || Silver Biznaga for Best Actress || Silvia Abascal ||  || rowspan = "4" | 
|-
| Silver Biznaga for Best Supporting Actress || Macarena Gómez || 
|-
| Silver Biznaga for Best Supporting Actor ||  Roberto San Martín || 
|-
| Silver Biznaga for Best Costume Design || Lorenzo Caprile || 
|-
| align = "center" | 2007 || 21st Goya Awards || Best Actress || Silvia Abascal ||  || 
|}

See also 
 List of Spanish films of 2006

References

External links
 

2006 comedy films
Films set in the 16th century
Spanish romantic comedy films
2000s historical comedy films
2006 romantic comedy films
Films based on works by Lope de Vega
Films shot at Ciudad de la Luz
2000s Spanish films
2000s Spanish-language films